Ahmed Ait Moulay (born 5 December 1964) is a Moroccan alpine skier. He competed at the 1984 Winter Olympics and the 1988 Winter Olympics.

References

1964 births
Living people
Moroccan male alpine skiers
Olympic alpine skiers of Morocco
Alpine skiers at the 1984 Winter Olympics
Alpine skiers at the 1988 Winter Olympics
Place of birth missing (living people)
20th-century Moroccan people